Sanga Natham is a 1984 Indian Tamil-language film directed by Ramineedu for Janasakthi Creations Pvt. Ltd. The film stars Rajesh and Rajya Lakshmi.

Cast 

Rajesh
Rajya Lakshmi
Nagesh
C. R. Vijayakumari
Vennira Aadai Moorthy
Senthil
Nizhalgal Ravi
Y. Vijaya
Srilatha

Soundtrack

Repcetion

References

1984 films
Films scored by Ilaiyaraaja
1980s Tamil-language films